The  dull-blue flycatcher  (Eumyias sordidus) is a small passerine bird in the flycatcher family, Muscicapidae. It was previously included in the genus Muscicapa.

This species is an endemic resident breeder in the hills of central Sri Lanka.

The dull-blue flycatcher breeds in deciduous mountain forest, invariably above 600m, although it is not common below 900m. The main breeding season is in March and April, but a second brood is often reared later in the year.

The cup-shaped nest is a lined compact mass of moss. The site is usually a well-shaded rock ledge. The normal clutch is two or three brown-spotted pink eggs are laid.

This species is 15 cm long. It is similar in shape to the spotted flycatcher and has a loud melodic song.. Adults are ashy blue, with a whitish belly. There is a black patch between the broad black bill and the eye, bordered with brighter blue above and below. Sexes are similar, but females are slightly duller.

Juvenile dull-blue flycatchers are brown, heavily spotted on the head, back, wing-coverts and breast with pale buff; their flight feathers are broadly edged with blue-grey.

This is relatively easy bird to see, despite its forest habitat. It feeds mainly on flying insects, beetles, caterpillars and other insects, but also eats berries.

In Culture

This bird appears in 50 Sri Lankan rupee bank note (2010 series).

References

 Birds of India by Grimmett, Inskipp and Inskipp, 

dull-blue flycatcher
Endemic birds of Sri Lanka
dull-blue flycatcher
dull-blue flycatcher